Polynoncus aricensis is a species of hide beetle in the subfamily Omorginae.

References

aricensis
Beetles described in 1950